Roger Hughes (born 1960) is an American football coach.

Roger Hughes may also refer to:

Roger Hughes (priest), English priest
Roger T. Hughes (born 1941), Canadian judge